Lion Comics (Tamil: லயன் காமிக்ஸ்) is a Tamil comic book series published by Prakash Publishers, in South India.  Both Lion Comics and its sister publication 'Muthu Comics' (முத்து காமிக்ஸ்), are published monthly in Tamil language.  In fact, Muthu Comics is the forerunner to Lion Comics, even though the latter has taken over as the leading brand of the comic publication. The Editor/publisher of the concern, Mr. S Vijayan, is based in Sivakasi, where the comics publishing house also is based out.

Almost all of the stories published are Tamil translations of primarily European and rarely some American comic series, including those from the British Comics Publisher of the same name - Lion.  Tex Willer, along with Lucky Luke and Mike Blueberry are the most popular cowboy heroes; Steel Claw and The Spider were the more popular superheroes during the comic house's best of times.

Related publications 

Muthu Comics (முத்து காமிக்ஸ்), Thigil Comics (திகில் காமிக்ஸ்), Mini-Lion (மினி லயன்)  and Junior-Lion (ஜூனியர் லயன்) are some of the other publications from the same concern. Comics Classics is the latest addition with re-printed run of more famous titles published in the past, during the so-called Golden Age of Tamil comics.

History 

The first issue of Muthu comics was published in 1971 as a monthly (128 pages, INR 0.90). It featured The Steel Claw (இரும்புக்கை மாயாவி in Tamil).  Although there had been a few comics publishers in Tamil from the early 60s, the entry of Muthu Comics marks the beginning of the Golden Age of Tamil Comics. Muthu comics enjoyed a warm welcome from the Tamil audience and with M.Soundrapandian, continued to grow steadily over the years.

The first among the Comic House's expansion ventures - a weekly (முத்து காமிக்ஸ் வாரமலர)  - was started in the early eighties, which was subsequently withdrawn after a few years. In 1984, after a brief lull, when there was no comics publications in the market, came Lion Comics (லயன் காமிக்ஸ). Lion Comics was a creation of Mr.Soundrapandian's son Vijayan. Vijayan became the Chief-editor of Lion comics when he was seventeen.

Expansion continued with the launch of the Junior-Lion (ஜூனியர் லயன்),  Mini-Lion (மினி லயன்) and Thigil comics (திகில் காமிக்ஸ்), all of which were published in parallel, on a monthly basis. Festivals like Diwali, Pongal and summer holidays promised special Digest Issues, which were bigger and costlier than the regular comic. These were the Golden years in Tamil Comics history.

1984 is also the year in which the Other major player in Tamil Comics - Rani Comics - was started by the ThinaThanthi (தினத்தந்தி in Tamil) group of Publishers. Rani comics would grow over to become the dominant market player for the next ten years or so.

Mid-eighties - The launch of private Television Channels and Satellite / Cable TV Public-access television, marked the beginning of the spiraling decline in the readership in the State, and Comics readership was no different. Children and youth were increasingly drawn into the new world introduced through Television media.

During the worst periods of hardship, readers were plagued with problems such as shortage of quality story/art work, non-availability in local stores and frequent delays in releasing scheduled titles. From 2012, there has been a revival of sorts, with regular monthly issues, with negligible timeline misses.

One by one, most of the local comic publishers perished, in this changed market place. Rani Comics bowed out with its 500th issue; Mini, Junior and Thigil comics were also eventually stopped, and later their comic characters or series were brought under the two "last men standing" brands, Lion and Muthu comics.

2000 to 2011: The Dog Years 

As of 2008, the Official Lioncomics.com website is no longer owned by Prakash Publishers. The site was up for renewal, and the publishers didn't show interest in keeping their presence on the Web, even though they continue to release Lion Comics and Muthu, often at prolonged gaps in between each issues.

There have been a brief revival in the comics interests with the publication of 'Comics Classics' - reprinted popular stories of yesteryear. Lion Comics continues to penetrate beyond its niche audience, but always is pulled down, by its irregular publishing schedule.

The current issue of Lion Comics, is their biggest venture yet. A Jumbo Edition carrying one of their lead characters, XIII. It was originally scheduled for 2009, then was pushed to various dates in 2010, and has finally been released in October 2010.  The issue is priced at INR 200, marking the costliest edition ever released by the comic publishing house. They have already attained quite an amount of success with their three specials, which were each priced INR 100, in past years. This issue is undoubtedly one of the fattest comic book releases ever in India, and probably the world over (in terms of a complete series in one volume). Sadly, that issue also marked a long period of absence from Tamil Comics publishers, all through the year, with an exception one INR 10 issue which immediately followed the Jumbo Special.

2012 onwards: The Renaissance 

2012 has really been a comeback year for the southern comic franchise, with regular monthly editions, and appearance in major book fairs in the city. They were also seen in India's own Comic Con, in September 2012, in Bengaluru.

The publishers have also started selling their books (available prints) through eBay India.

In January 2013, Mr. S.Vijayan released mega special issue "MUTHU NEVER BEFORE SPECIAL" with 456 pages (400 pages in color) @ Rs. 400 to celebrate the 40th year of Muthu Comics. In 2015, Lion comics also published Captain Tiger's (Mike Blueberry) "MINNUM MARANAM complete saga" [Blueberry -(complete 11 Editions from Chihuahua Pearl(13th book) to Arizona Love(23rd book)] with 596 pages @ Rs. 1000 in April Chennai Book fair, where "MINNUM MARANAM complete saga" becomes landmark book in Tamil comics history and holds the record of Costliest book in Tamil Comics History.

During August 2015 Muthu comics celebrated its 350th book by releasing Classic Cartoon Collection(CCC), The Smurfs was introduced as part of CCC to mark
Muthu comics 350. The book was released in Erode book fair(EBF).

Long-awaited  (Mister Blueberry/OK Corral series) was released during the 2016 Chennai Book fair. Tamil version of என் பெயர் டைகர்(Mister Blueberry/OK Corral series) released as single album whole series (from Dargaud Blueberry series book #24 to #28). As first ever try, Muthu comics released this book in both B/W and color version at same time.

Tamil version of Blueberry-Fort navajo (single album of 5parts) was released during the Erode book fair 2017, its first-ever color reprint of same by Lionmuthu comics. The book seems splendid hit as people approached book fair stalls (erode, CBE, etc..) during 2017 returning empty-handed due to sold-out boards for இரத்தக் கோட்டை.

Featured heroes 
Some of the more popular comic heroes introduced to Tamil audience were

There were also occasional appearances of Batman & Joker, James Bond 007, Judge Dredd and Sexton Blake.

Featured graphic novels
following are some of the best international comic novels published by Lion comics in recent past

Role of the editor 

It must be stressed here that unlike the rest-of-the-world, in India, there is still the dominant view that comics 'are just for kids'. Successfully running a comics publishing house in such social milieu speaks greatly of the determination and the sense-of-purpose of the publishers. Mr.S Vijayan, the editor has a good chemistry with the readers, through his 'Hotline' and 'Comics Time' forewords that appears in every issue of Lion comics.

Old issues of Lion and Muthu comics were stacked up in their warehouse at Sivakasi, which used to be a cynosure of eyes for those who visit the place. Reports of theft of comics, and illegal scans of those, have prompted the administrators to disallow access to this Treasure Chest, for all Tamil Comics lovers. Mr. Soundarapandan says that upgrading the ware house into a library is economically not feasible, due to the dwindling population that reads comics.

Recently, Mr. Vijayan was interviewed for South India-based Kalaignar TV, where he went over his comics passion and the business in general. In the Interview, he also stressed on bringing the Lion Comics official back online by the end of 2009, to keep the readers abreast of the latest happenings. But it took until 2012, when he launched his personal blog, and a website. While the website is not maintained up-to-date, he is more regular in his blog, often reviewing the old titles, and sharing the news on the upcoming ones.  Mr. Vijayan continues to be the "Lone Man Standing", as far as Tamil Comics are concerned.

References

External links 
 Tripod page on all lion/muthu characters 
 Lion Muthu comics official Blog 
 Lion Muthu comics official Site 
 Lion Muthu comics official Store 

Indian comics